The Most Wanted Man or Public Enemy Number One is a 1953 French-Italian comedy film directed by Henri Verneuil and starring Fernandel, Zsa Zsa Gabor and Louis Seigner. It was shot at Cinecittà Studios in Rome. The film's sets were designed by the art director Robert Giordani. It was one of many co-productions between the France and Italy during the postwar era.

Synopsis
An ordinary American man is mistaken for a public enemy number one after he puts on a gangster's coat. Only with the help of the real gangster's girlfriend, Lola, is he able to bring the criminal to justice and clear his own name.

Cast 
 Fernandel as Joe Calvet
 Zsa Zsa Gabor as Lola la Blonde
 Louis Seigner as Le directeur de la prison
 David Opatoshu as Slim le Tueur
 Nicole Maurey as 	Peggy
 Alfred Adam as Le shérif
 Jean Marchat as L'attorney general
 Saturnin Fabre as W.W. Stone, l’avocat
 Paolo Stoppa as Teddy « Tony » Fallone
 Tino Buazzelli as Parker
 Carlo Ninchi as Nick le Flicard
 Guglielmo Barnabò as M Click
 Arturo Bragaglia as Jack le Caissier
 Paul Barge as Le gardien-chef 
 Michel Ardan as Un Inspecteur
 Jess Hahn as Walter le Vicieux, un truand
 André Dalibert as 	Un surveillant
 Bob Ingarao as Le chef de la police
 Manuel Gary as Charly

References

Bibliography
 Higbee, Will & Leahy, Sarah. Studies in French Cinema: UK perspectives, 1985-2010. Intellect Books, 27 2014.

External links 

1953 comedy films
1953 films
Films directed by Henri Verneuil
French comedy films
Italian comedy films
Italian black-and-white films
French black-and-white films
1950s French-language films
Films shot at Cinecittà Studios
Films with screenplays by Michel Audiard
1950s Italian films
1950s French films